Gabriel Gonsum Ganaka was the Roman Catholic Bishop (later Archbishop) of Jos, Nigeria.

Born 24 May 1937 in Pankshin, he was ordained a priest on 4 July 1965. On 17 May 1973, aged 36, he was appointed as Auxiliary Bishop of Jos and as titular Bishop of Cuicul. He was consecrated on 9 September 1973 by Cardinal Dominic Ekandem.

On 5 October 1974, he was appointed Bishop of Jos. On 26 March 1994, aged 56, he was elevated to Archbishop.

Ganaka died on 11 November 1999, aged 62. On 2014, the Roman Catholic Archdiocese of Jos opened his cause for beatification naming him a Servant of God.

References

External links
 Gabriel Ganaka entry at Catholic Hierarchy.org website

1937 births
1999 deaths
People from Plateau State
Servants of God
20th-century Roman Catholic bishops in Nigeria
Roman Catholic archbishops of Jos
Roman Catholic bishops of Jos